The Rostov State Puppet Theater (Russian:Ростовский государственный театр кукол) is a puppet theater founded in Rostov-on-Don in 1935. The building is located at 46 Universitetsky Lane.

History 
Rostov State Puppet Theater is one of the oldest puppet theaters in the country. It was established by a group of puppeteers who had started to perform for children in 1920s. The founders included M. Kushnarenko, N. Smirnova, A. Dora, and others.  These performers achieved such success, inspiration, and enthusiasm that the Azov-Black Sea Regional Committee of Komsomol (Young Communist League) resolved to establish them as a puppet theater. The theater first opened its doors in 1935. Several generations of Don land audiences grew up watching its performances, and continue to bring their children and grandchildren to the theater.

Over the years, the puppet theater has been headed by numerous famous directors, including Boris Sakhnovsky (a student of Konstantin Stanislavsky) and Leonid Stelmakhovich (a student of Vsevolod Meyerhold).

For over 35 years the art director of the puppet theater was Vladimir Bylkov, a student of Sergei Obraztsov.

The theater still recognizes its founding performers: S. Isaeva, Merited Artist of Russia; M. Kushnarenko (whose grand-daughter Elena works at the theater today); S. Ulybashev, L. Chubkov, G. Pidko, A. Derkach, and many others. Over its history, the Rostov Puppet Theater has staged over 5000 plays.

The theater's repertoire features classic plays including "Turnip", "Ivan Tsarevich and the Grey wolf", Buzzy-Wuzzy Busy Fly, Teremok, "Maryyushka and the baba-yaga", "Fear Takes Molehills For Mountains", "Gold tea", "Pirate sweet tooth", "Little Mermaid", "A wolf and kids", Buratino, "Little Red Riding Hood" and many others. 

In 2016, work began on a new program called "Theatrical Magic Behind the Scenes". The project's main objective is to show children and their parents the internal operations of a theater. It includes demonstrations where the theater's performers describe its workings, train attendees in acting exercises, and even allow guests to operate a real puppet.

Building 
The theater's current building was constructed in the mid-1960s on a site that had been occupied since 1909 by the Annunciation Greek Church, using the demolished church's foundation and walls.

References 

Tourist attractions in Rostov-on-Don
Buildings and structures in Rostov-on-Don